Surprise Valley may refer to:

Surprise Valley, Modoc County, California, U.S.
Surprise Valley, San Bernardino County, California, U.S.
Surprise Valley, former name of Cedarville, California, U.S.
Rural Municipality of Surprise Valley No. 9, Saskatchewan, Canada
"Surprise Valley", a song by Widespread Panic from the 1999 album 'Til the Medicine Takes